Grossmanite is a very rare mineral of the pyroxene group, with formula CaTi3+AlSiO6. It is the titanium-dominant member. Grossmanite is unique in being a mineral with trivalent titanium, a feature shared with tistarite, Ti2O3. Titanium in minerals is almost exclusively tetravalent. Grossmanite stands for titanium-analogue of davisite, esseneite and kushiroite - other members of the pyroxene group. Both grossmanite and tistarite come from the famous Allende meteorite.

References

Pyroxene group
Inosilicates
Calcium minerals
Titanium minerals
Aluminium minerals
Monoclinic minerals